The 2009-10 European Badminton Circuit season started in May 2009 and ended in May 2010.

Results

Winners

Performance by countries
Tabulated below are the Circuit performances based on countries. Only countries who have won a title are listed:

References 

European Badminton Circuit
European Badminton Circuit
European Badminton Circuit seasons